Alex Emilio Timossi Andersson (born 19 January 2001) is a Swedish professional footballer who plays as a winger for Eredivisie club Heerenveen.

Club career
A youth academy graduate of Helsingborgs IF, Andersson made his senior team debut on 17 April 2017 in a 1–1 draw against Gefle. He scored his first goal on 13 May 2017 in a 2–2 draw against IK Frej.

On 27 October 2017, Bayern Munich announced that they have agreed a transfer with Helsingborgs for Andersson. He was expected to join Bayern on 1 July 2019, but eventually joined the under-19 team of Bayern in July 2018.

On 6 February 2020, Andersson returned to Helsingborgs on a short term loan deal till 30 June. His contract was later extended till the end of the 2020 Allsvenskan season. On 8 February 2021, he joined Austria Klagenfurt on loan until the end of the season.

On July 6 2022, Andersson joined Eredivisie club Heerenveen permanently on a four-year contract until 2026, for an undisclosed fee.

International career
Andersson is a Swedish youth international. He was part of under-17 team which reached quarter-finals of 2018 UEFA European Under-17 Championship.

Honours
Helsingborgs IF
Superettan: 2018

References

External links
 
 
 

2001 births
Living people
Sportspeople from Helsingborg
Association football midfielders
Association football wingers
Swedish footballers
Sweden youth international footballers
Allsvenskan players
Superettan players
2. Liga (Austria) players
Austrian Football Bundesliga players
Eredivisie players
Helsingborgs IF players
SK Austria Klagenfurt players
SC Heerenveen players
Swedish expatriate footballers
Swedish expatriate sportspeople in Germany
Swedish expatriate sportspeople in Austria
Swedish expatriate sportspeople in the Netherlands
Expatriate footballers in Germany
Expatriate footballers in Austria
Expatriate footballers in the Netherlands